The Lincoln Courier is the only local daily newspaper for Lincoln, Illinois, and its surrounding circulation area, which includes Logan County. The newspaper is owned by Gannett. Founded in 1889, the Courier traces its history back to 1855-1856 through one of the newspapers it acquired, the Lincoln Weekly Herald.    

Founded as the Lincoln Daily Courier in 1889, the newspaper through the years absorbed several other dailies based in Lincoln, such as the Daily Star (founded  as The Lincoln Morning Star) and The Daily News-Herald, which itself dated back to The Daily News (} and The Lincoln Weekly Herald.  Like other businesses founded in Lincoln, Illinois, the Lincoln Weekly Herald was one of the first firms named in honor of then-future President Abraham Lincoln.

References

External links
Lincoln Courier website

Lincoln, Illinois
Newspapers published in Illinois
1889 establishments in Illinois
Publications established in 1889
Gannett publications